Ben Murphy is a British pilot. He is a pilot of The Blades aerobatic team, and master class of the Red Bull Air Race World Championship. He is a former Commanding Officer of the Royal Air Force display team The Red Arrows

Biography 
His grandfathers were Royal Air Force pilots. While attending Newcastle University, he belonged to the Air Squadron. 

In 1997, he enlisted in the Royal Air Force. In 2006, he was appointed team pilot of Red Arrows.

In 2016, he joined the Red Bull Air Race as Challenger class pilot. In 2018, he was promoted to the master class from the Challenger class of Red Bull Air Race.

In 2019, he finished 4th in the Red Bull Air Race World Championship in only his second season as a Master Class Pilot 

He uses Zivko Edge 540 V2 (Aircraft registration: N540BM) in the air race. The aircraft's liveries are Union Jack. The original owner of this aircraft was Peter Podlunšek (S5-MPP).

Results

Red Bull Air Race

Challenger Class 

Legend: * CAN: Cancelled * DNP: Did not take part * DNS: Did not start * DSQ: Disqualified

Master Class

Gallery

References

External links
 

1975 births
Living people
British aviators
British air racers
Red Bull Air Race World Championship pilots
Aerobatic pilots